Robert Maynard Pirsig (September 6, 1928 – April 24, 2017) was an American writer and philosopher. He was the author of the philosophical novels Zen and the Art of Motorcycle Maintenance: An Inquiry into Values (1974) and Lila: An Inquiry into Morals (1991), and he co-authored On Quality: An Inquiry Into Excellence: Selected and Unpublished Writings (2022) along with his wife (now widow) and editor, Wendy Pirsig.

Early life
Pirsig was born on September 6, 1928, in Minneapolis, Minnesota, the son of Harriet Marie Sjobeck and Maynard Pirsig. He was of German and Swedish descent. His father was a graduate of the University of Minnesota Law School, taught in that school from 1934, served as its dean from 1948 to 1955, and retired from teaching there in 1970. He subsequently taught at the William Mitchell College of Law until his retirement in 1993.

A precocious child with an alleged IQ of 170 at the age of nine, Pirsig skipped several grades at the Blake School in Minneapolis. In May 1943, Pirsig was awarded a high school diploma at the age of 14 by the University High School (later renamed Marshall-University High School), where he had edited the school yearbook, the Bisbilla.  Pirsig then studied biochemistry at the University of Minnesota. In Zen and the Art of Motorcycle Maintenance, he describes the central character, thought to represent himself, as being an atypical student, interested in science in itself rather than a professional career path.

In the course of his studies, Pirsig became intrigued by the multiplicity of putative causes for a given phenomenon, and increasingly focused on the role played by hypotheses in the scientific method and sources from which they originate.  His preoccupation with these matters led to a decline in his grades and expulsion from the university.

In 1946, Pirsig enlisted in the United States Army and was stationed in South Korea until 1948. Upon his discharge from the Army, he lived for several months in Seattle, Washington, and then returned to the University of Minnesota, from which he received a bachelor's degree in 1950. He subsequently studied philosophy at Banaras Hindu University in India and the Committee on the Analysis of Ideas and Study of Methods at the University of Chicago.  In 1958 he earned a master's degree in journalism from the University of Minnesota.

Career
In 1958, he became a professor at Montana State University in Bozeman, and taught creative writing courses for two years. Shortly thereafter he taught at the University of Illinois at Chicago.

Pirsig's published writing consists most notably of two books. The better known, Zen and the Art of Motorcycle Maintenance, delves into Pirsig's exploration into the nature of quality. Ostensibly a first-person narrative based on a motorcycle trip he and his young son Chris had taken from Minneapolis to San Francisco, it is an exploration of the underlying metaphysics of Western culture. He also gives the reader a short summary of the history of philosophy, including his interpretation of the philosophy of Aristotle as part of an ongoing dispute between universalists, admitting the existence of universals, and the Sophists, opposed by Socrates and his student Plato. Pirsig finds in "Quality" a special significance and common ground between Western and Eastern world views.

Pirsig had great difficulty finding a publisher for Zen and the Art of Motorcycle Maintenance. Pirsig pitched the idea for his book to 121 different publishers, sending them a cover letter along with two sample pages, with 22 responding favorably. Ultimately, an editor at William Morrow accepted the finished manuscript; when he did, his publisher's internal recommendation stated, "This book is brilliant beyond belief, it is probably a work of genius, and will, I'll wager, attain classic stature." In his book review, George Steiner compared Pirsig's writing to Dostoevsky, Broch, Proust, and Bergson, stating that "the assertion itself is valid ... the analogies with Moby-Dick are patent".

Pirsig described the development of his ideas and writing his book in a videotaped lecture that can be viewed on YouTube. The talk was at the Minneapolis College of Art and Design on May 20, 1974. A transcript of this talk also appears as the introduction to On Quality: An Inquiry into Excellence, a 2022 book of Pirsig's unpublished and selected writings.

In 1974, Pirsig was awarded a Guggenheim Fellowship to allow him to write a follow-up, Lila: An Inquiry into Morals (1991), in which he developed a value-based metaphysics, Metaphysics of Quality, that challenges our subject–object view of reality. The second book, this time "the captain" of a sailboat, follows on from where Zen and the Art of Motorcycle Maintenance left off.

Pirsig was vice-president of the Minnesota Zen Meditation Center from 1973 to 1975 and also served on the board of directors.

Personal life
Robert Pirsig married Nancy Ann James on May 10, 1954. They had two sons: Chris, born in 1956, and Theodore (Ted), born in 1958.

Pirsig had a mental breakdown and spent time in and out of psychiatric hospitals between 1961 and 1963. He was diagnosed with schizophrenia and treated with electroconvulsive therapy on numerous occasions, a treatment he discusses in Zen and the Art of Motorcycle Maintenance. Nancy sought a divorce during this time; they formally separated in 1976 and divorced in 1978. On December 28, 1978, Pirsig married Wendy Kimball in Tremont, Maine.

In 1979, his son Chris, who figured prominently in Zen and the Art of Motorcycle Maintenance, was fatally stabbed in a mugging outside the San Francisco Zen Center at the age of 22. Pirsig discusses this tragedy in an afterword to subsequent editions of Zen and the Art of Motorcycle Maintenance, writing that he and his second wife Wendy Kimball decided not to abort the child they conceived in 1980 because he believed that this unborn childlater their daughter Nellwas a continuation of the "life pattern" that Chris had occupied.

Pirsig died aged 88, at his home in South Berwick, Maine, on April 24, 2017, after a period of failing health.

Legacy and recognition
Pirsig received a Guggenheim Fellowship in 1974 for General Nonfiction, which later allowed him to complete his second book.  The University of Minnesota conferred an Outstanding Achievement Award in 1975. He won an award for literature from the American Academy and Institute of Arts and Letters in 1979.

On December 15, 2012, Montana State University bestowed upon Pirsig an honorary doctorate in philosophy during the university's fall commencement.  Pirsig was also honored in a commencement speech by MSU Regent Professor Michael Sexson. Pirsig had been an instructor in writing at what was then Montana State College from 1958 to 1960.

Pirsig did not travel to Bozeman in December 2012 to accept the accolade, allegedly due to frailty of health. However, in Zen and the Art of Motorcycle Maintenance, Pirsig writes about his time at Montana State College as a less than pleasurable experience, and that this limited his ability to teach writing effectively and to develop his own philosophy and writing.

In December 2019, the Smithsonian's National Museum of American History acquired Pirsig's 1966 Honda CB77F Super Hawk on which the 1968 ride with his son Chris was taken. The donation included a manuscript of Zen and the Art of Motorcycle Maintenance, a signed first edition of the book, and tools and clothing from the ride. In 2020, the Smithsonian acquired additional material from the Pirsig family relating to Pirsig's maritime interests and background. In 2020, the Robert M. Pirsig archive was collected by the Houghton Library at Harvard University, Cambridge, Massachusetts; a 2021 article in the International Journal of Motorcycle Studies details the writer's close historic relationship with motorcycles from the age of four to shortly before his death.

See also 
 James Verne Dusenberry

Notes

External links

 
 The Motorcycle is Yourself: Revisiting 'Zen and the Art of Motorcycle Maintenance' CBC interview
 Photographs from Pirsig's 1968 trip upon which Zen and the Art of Motorcycle Maintenance is based
 NPR interviews with Pirsig: Audio: 1974 and Audio: 1992
 Audio excerpt from BBC radio program about cult books

 
1928 births
2017 deaths
20th-century American philosophers
20th-century American novelists
American expatriates in Belgium
American expatriates in Ireland
American expatriates in Norway
American expatriates in Sweden
American expatriates in the United Kingdom
American people of German descent
American people of Swedish descent
Banaras Hindu University alumni
Military personnel from Minnesota
Motorcycling writers
Writers from Minneapolis
People with schizophrenia
Philosophers of technology
People with mood disorders
United States Army soldiers
University of Chicago alumni
University of Minnesota alumni
American male novelists
Novelists from Minnesota
American male non-fiction writers
20th-century American male writers
Notable residents of Montana